Brites Anes (born c. 1460) was a mistress of King John II of Portugal. They had one daughter, Brites Anes de Santarém born c. 1485.

1460s births
Year of death unknown
Mistresses of Portuguese royalty
15th-century Portuguese people
15th-century Portuguese women